is a Japanese manga series written by Madoka Takadono and illustrated by Utako Yukihiro. An anime adaptation was animated by Doga Kobo and aired from July 7, 2013 to September 22, 2013.

Plot
England, 1889. Seventeen-year-old William Twining, a genius aristocrat, learns of his family's bankruptcy and finds his life suddenly turned upside down when he accidentally summons a demon in his family's basement while looking for money to pay for his tuition. The demon, Dantalion, reveals to William that he is the "Elector" — the one who can choose the interim ruler over Hell as its emperor, Lucifer, rests to regain his strength — and a descendant of King Solomon, who had powers over demons known as his seventy-two pillars. William, who is a scientific realist, does not believe in demons and refuses to become involved with the power struggle in Hell. However, Dantalion stays close to William and decides to go to his school until he is chosen to be the interim king. Dantalion is joined by Sytry and Camio, his fellow pillars and interim candidates, as they become attached to the reincarnation of their beloved master. As more powerful figures learn of William's ancient heritage and plot to use him to their benefits, William finds himself at the center of a war between Hell and Heaven while discovering the mysteries that surrounds him and Solomon's enigmatic past.

Characters

Main characters
 
 
 The protagonist and the reincarnation/descendant of King Solomon (though he seems to have no recollection of his past life),  William is the orphaned son of a British noble family that's older than the British Royal Family and takes great pride of his family's lineage. Highly intelligent, William has been the top of his class three years running at Stradford and is also a fifth-year prefect. Despite his family's bankruptcy, he maintains lofty dreams of high-class society for his future, though he constantly worries about how to pay for his school fees with his considerable financial situation.

 William considers himself a realist and does not believe in demons or angels, but gradually become more accepting as he starts getting involved with the supernatural, though he strongly wishes to stay out of it. As Solomon's reincarnation, he retains an ability to negate the demonic powers of the 72 pillars demons. As the closest descendant of Solomon, he's also the one who holds Solomon's soul and is the "Elector", the human with the ability to choose the next temporary emperor of Hell while Lucifer rests.

 
 
 Kevin is the butler and general manservant to William and his family has served the Twining family for many generations. Kevin enjoys gambling and sometimes make bets on his master, which irritates William and result in being punished. As the only servant that stayed with William after the Twining family bankruptcy, he looks after the mansion and tends to his master needs, but he later replaced Ernest Crosby as priest at Stradford School when he was debilitated.

 Furthermore, he's been impersonating the real Kevin Cecil since the death of William's parents. His angelic form is now marked by the absence of a wing, taken by the Archangel Michael, and holds much influence among English churches. Once William learned that he was not the real Kevin Cecil, he eventually comes clean about his true identity to William, who forgives him for his lies.

 
 
 Dantalion is the Grand Duke of Hell, commander of the 36 armies of Hell and a Nephilim demon candidate to succeed the throne of the demon world while Lucifer slumbers. He is the 71st pillar of Soloman's 72 pillars, and is followed by two bat-familiars, Amon and Mamon. Having annihilated an entire tribe in his past life, Dantalion became a demon after contracting with Lucifer and become known as "The One Who Plays the Flute". As the only contractee Lucifer ever had, Dantalion is Lucifer's direct descendant and possesses powers that could surpass the Four Kings of Hell. While disguised at William's school, he calls himself "Dantalion Huber" and participates in various sports, making him popular with the jocks.

 
 
 As a fallen angel, Sytry is a pure demon, and thus looks down upon demons that were formerly human. The 12th pillar of Solomon, and also a viscount and Prince of Hell who reigns over 60 armies of Hell. He is also a candidate nominated to succeed the throne by his abusive and controlling uncle, Baalberith. It was later revealed that Sytry's mother is Gabriel and that he was never a fallen angel, rather his uncle sealed his angelic powers and deceive Sytry and everyone that he has fallen. Metatron eventually captures Sytry and takes him back to Heaven, brainwashing him into taking over his mother's mantle as the new "Gabriel". In his true form, Sytry has the face of a leopard and wings of a griffin, and can take the form of a handsome man or beautiful woman. He has the ability to stir up human desire and make women show themselves naked if he desires. While disguised at William's school, he calls himself "Sytry Cartwright" and is treated like a princess at Stradford School because of his beauty.

 
 
 A demon general, Camio is the 53rd pillar who commands 30 armies and a Great President of Hell. He is a half-demon, born from the illegitimate union of his human mother, Princess Cassandra of Troy, and Lucifer, therefore possess power surpassing the Four Kings. His human form is that of a young man holding a saber, but his true form is that of a thrush. He can tell his summoner what birds and animals are saying, as well as the meaning behind the sound that water makes. He is a candidate for substitute king nominated by Beelzebub. At Stradford School, Camio goes under the alias "Nathan Caxton" and is the Head Boy, who William admires.

 
 
 Isaac is a friend to William at Stradford School and has a heavily interest in the arcane and occult arts. Although Isaac and William have contrasting personalities, they are good friends and Isaac takes part of the supernatural surrounding William with joy. While not as intelligent as William, Isaac has more knowledge about the demon world and shown to be more skilled in using magic than him. He is descended from merchants and his father gained a fortune trading spices and tea from India.

Demons
 
 
 Gilles "Bluebeard" de Rais was the previous incarnation of the murderous general of Jeanne d'Arc, his full name being: "Baron de Rais and Count of Brienne, Gilles de Monmorency-Laval". Gilles has been dead for around 400 years, and is currently a Nephilim subordinate to the Great Demon Duke Baalberith. He is in love with Jeanne and seeks power in order to break Michael's hold over her and make her human again.

 
 
 A dark-skinned woman, Astaroth is the Southern Grand Duchess of Hell, and the leader of 40 armies. A grand demon considered to be as strong as Beelzebub, she is ranked 29th in Hell. She is also the former wife to Beelzebub, mother of Lamia, and the leader of the Nephilim. She is also the guardian to Dantalion, as well as the one who nominated him as a candidate for substitute king. Her previous incarnation was the Queen of Egypt Hatshepsut, who died of cavities, and an ancestor of Solomon. As the war between Hell and Heaven escalates, Astaroth goes to rest to restore her power and prolong her lifespan, leaving Dantalion without any support.

 
 
 The Western Duke and leader of the Anti-Nephilim faction, he chose Sytry as his candidate for substitute king. Although Sytry is his nephew, he treats him poorly, considering him as his "puppet", and was the one that caused Sytry to become a demon.

 
 
 The Northern Duke and former husband of Astaroth, Beelzebub is a top-level demon who commands 16 armies, one of the kings of the four corners of the world, and one of the seven demon kings. He chose Camio as his candidate for substitute king.

 
 
 The Eastern Duke and Chief Steward of the demon world, Samael is the only king that has not chosen a candidate for substitute king as he is more loyal to Lucifer and continues to carry out his orders, setting numerous plots into motion.

 
 
 Lamia is 77th in the demonic hierarchy with a court rank of princess. She is greatly infatuated with Dantalion, going far as claiming to be his fiancée. She is the daughter of Astaroth and Beelzebub, currently under the care of her mother and takes orders from her.

  and 
  (Amon), Yūto Suzuki (Mamon)
 Black bat Amon and white bat Mamon are Dantalion's familiars and acts as his informants/observers when concerning William's status and liaisons to Hell. Although they adore their master and fear his temper, they are not above dragging Dantalion back to the demon world to fulfill his duties.

 
 
 Baphomet is a black-furred goat butler of Dantalion and an earl. He looks after Dantalion's home, and can cook delicious food and desserts.

 
 
 Leonard is a white-furred sheep butler of Sytry and rival to Dantalion's butler, Baphomet. Like Baphomet, he can cook delicious food and desserts.

 
 
 Eligos is the 15th pillar of Solomon with the rank of marchioness, commander of 60 armies, and subordinate to Beelzebub.

 
 The emperor of Hell and a fallen angel, Lucifer rebelled against God and was beaten down by his brother Michael and sent to Hell. To preserve his eternal life, he must rest periodically and in that period, a substitute king is named.

Humans
 
 
 King Solomon of Israel was the illegitimate son of David, and spent his childhood imprisoned and learning to use magic and summon demons. Solomon was known for his master intelligence, hailed as the greatest wise man in the world and the one blessed by God. Although Solomon was beloved by his people, he spend his time with his demons and got along peacefully with many of them, and even had a deep bond with Lucifer. He was particularly close to Dantalion, who was his first demon and was killed by him upon his wishes.

 
 
 Mycroft is another friend and fellow prefect to William at Stradford, they usually do favors for each other and Swallow sometimes covers William when he disappears. Unlike Isaac, he has no knowledge about the demon world that surrounds William, but was involved with an incident relating to demons after his father make a contract with Eligos.

 
 
 Ernest Crosby is the former pastor for the Stradford church and member of the "Hand of God," a special organization of exorcists.

 
 A magician, former member of the "Hand of God" and Count of Glenstrae, Mathers wishes to strengthen the human race to prevent demons and angels from using them. He took the position of a teacher at Stradford School in order to teach William how to use magic, and even allowed Isaac to practice with them.

 
 
 Maria Mollins is the former dormitory mother of Stradford School, and was considered to be a strict but caring woman with students. As a young girl, she met Camio and learned of his demon heritage. She fell in love with him, but Camio disappeared to protect her from the demon world. She is reunited with him years later and then left the school due to lung problems, but Camio visits her frequently.

 
 
 Adrian Swallow was the father of Mycroft Swallow and a baron politician. After an accident that should have caused him to die, he made a deal with Eligos for his soul to live longer, but was eventually destroyed by the exorcists.

 
 Elizabeth is the proposed fiancée for Mycroft Swallow, whom she calls "Mike". She is an American with a loud demeanor, which causes her to be ridiculed by the high class women of England.

 
 Elliot Eden is an intelligent boy at Stradford School that comes from a line of reverends, and was possessed by Michael in order to meet William at school.

 
 Barton Twining is the uncle of William Twining, and was in charge of William's assets after losing his parents and took him under his care. He is also an archaeologist and funds archaeological digs. When his business fails and goes bankrupt, the debt collectors take all possessions from the Twining estate and he disappears after the bankruptcy.

Angels
 
 
 Michael is a cruel and devious archangel, the Chief of Angels and "The One Who Resembles God". He is the brother of Lucifer and plots to make sure his brother does not return to his throne and make William into a pawn for Heaven. Since he is active and giving orders to Kevin, he is fading from lack of rest.

 
 
 Raguel is mysterious young man and an exorcist for the "Hand of God", as well as an angel that serves under Uriel. He is very devoted to Kevin/Uriel and is aware of his conflicted loyalties to William and Heaven.

 
 A high-ranking angel, Metatron is the Chief of the Virtues and was once a human. Although childish and happy-go-lucky, Metatron possesses a duplicitous and manipulative nature with a strong fixation on Michael, whom he seeks to overthrow.

 
 
 Jeanne was a former famous heroine who was turned into a loyal soldier for Heaven by Michael and is a general for his "Army of Salvation". Due to her strength and skills, she is slated to become an archangel on Michael's nomination.

Media

Manga
Written by Madoka Takadono and drawn by Utako Yukihiro, Makai Ouji: Devils and Realist has been serialized in the shōjo manga magazine Monthly Comic Zero Sum since its debut in late 2009. The chapters are published in tankōbon by Ichijinsha. The series concluded in February 2018, and has released a total of fifteen volumes so far. Limited editions versions are also published that features alternative book covers and special color arts.

The German publishing company Carlsen Comics and Taiwan company Ever Glory Publishing have licensed the series. In France, it was licensed by Tonkam under the title "Devils and Realist" and the first volume was released on August 24, 2011. The Italian publishing company known as Goen has licensed the series under "Devils and Realist" in 2012, and has released a total of three volumes so far. North American publishing company Seven Seas Entertainment has licensed the series under the title "Devils and Realist" as well and the first volume was released on April 15, 2014.

Anime
It was announced on December 24, 2012 that an anime adaptation of the series was in production, consisting of twelve episodes, and premiered on July 7, 2013. Crunchyroll streamed the series with English subtitles as it airs in Japan. The anime has been licensed in North America by Sentai Filmworks, and was released on March 17, 2015 on DVD/Blu-ray subtitled-only format.

The anime television series is produced by Doga Kobo and Pony Canyon, directed by Chiaki Kon, written by Michiko Yokote, and features character designs by Kikuko Sadakata. The opening and ending themes, "Believe My Dice" and "a shadow's love song", respectively, are performed by Takuya Eguchi, Takuma Terashima, Yoshitsugu Matsuoka, and Tetsuya Kakihara. A CD for the songs was released on July 24, 2013.

The first Makai Ouji: Devils and Realist Blu-ray/DVD set was released on September 18, 2013 and the second set was released on October 16, 2013. The third set was released on November 20, 2013 and the fourth set on December 18, 2013. The fifth set was released January 1, 2014 and the sixth and final set on February 19, 2014. Limited editions of the Blu-ray/DVD included special goods and alternative disc covers.

Episode list

Music
A CD for the opening and ending songs was released on July 24, 2013. On November 6, 2013, an album of ten character songs was released and performed by the voice actors of the main characters. As part of the album, it contains a solo versions of "Believe My Dice" performed by William's voice actor, Takuya Eguchi, and Sytry's voice actor, Yoshitsugu Matsuoka, respectively. Dantalion's voice actor, Takuma Terashima, and Camio's voice actor, Tetsuya Kakihara, performed their respective solo versions of "a shadow's love song".

Drama CDs 
A limited edition drama CD titled "「realist and companion」" was released and sold during the 84th Comiket. Buyers who purchased the DVD/Blu-ray sets at Animate received a special drama CD titled "「realist and steward」".

Publications
It contains artworks of its manga and anime series, and interviews with Madoka Takadono,  Utako Yukihiro, Michiko Yokote, and Chiaki Kon.

Another book titled  was released on December 25, 2013.

Video game
Namco Bandai Games announced the development of a video game adaptation titled  for Nintendo 3DS. It features an original storyline and introduced two new characters, Rashid voiced by Yoshimasa Hosoya and Hebdar voiced by Tomokazu Sugita.

The game elements has decision-making points and branching storylines, as well as multiple endings. As part of the original storyline, Kevin will become a candidate for the interim ruler of Hell. As the player progress through the story as William, the game will measure William's wealth and his friendship with the demon characters (Dantalion, Sytry, and Camio) and Kevin. Since the game will include multiple endings, the story will end differently depending on whether the player choose to bond with the demons and Kevin, or follow your own desires. To help complete every route, the game will have a chart that lets the player review every decision-making point the player has passed and the player's friendship levels with the demons and Kevin.

In the limited edition version, buyers can also receive a special CD drama, a booklet containing Utako Yukihiro's artworks and visuals, and interviews about the originals characters. The game was released on September 26, 2013.

Musical
A musical adaptation of the manga ran between June 1, 2016, to June 5 at the Zenrōsai Hall Space Zero in Shibuya, Tokyo. Tsuneyasu Motoyoshi (Emukichi-Beat) directed the musical, Naohiro Ise wrote the script, and CLIE produced the play. Mashū Ishiwatari portrayed William, Taiyō Ayukawa as Dantalion, Takuya Kawaharada as Sytry, Kōhei Norizuki as Kevin, Masato Saki as Gilles de Rais, Seiya Konishi as Isaac Morton, Kousuke Yonehara as Camio, Yūichi Matsumoto as Crosby, Ken as Baphomet, and Makoto Endō as Baalberith. A DVD of the performance shipped in October 2016 in Japan.

In June 2017, a sequel to the first musical was announced and is set to be performed in November 2017. Tsuneyasu Motoyoshi returns to direct the musical, with Naohiro Ise is returning to write the script and CLIE producing the play as well. Returning from the first musical, Mashū Ishiwatari and Taiyō Ayukawa will reprise their roles as William and Dantalion, respectively. The play will run from November 4–12 at Shinjuku FACE.

References

External links
 Official Zero-Sum Makai Ouji: Devils and Realist website 
 Official Makai Ouji: Devils and Realist anime website 
 Official TV Tokyo Makai Ouji: Devils and Realist website 
 Official Makai Ouji: Devils and Realist video game website 
 

2009 manga
2013 anime television series debuts
Adventure anime and manga
Comedy anime and manga
Cultural depictions of Gilles de Rais
Cultural depictions of Hatshepsut
Cultural depictions of Joan of Arc
Doga Kobo
Ichijinsha manga
Josei manga
Sentai Filmworks
Seven Seas Entertainment titles
Supernatural anime and manga
Tokyo MX original programming